is a Japanese former professional boxer who competed from 2013 to 2022. He held the WBA (Regular) middleweight title twice between 2017 and 2021, and the WBA (Super) middleweight title from 2021 to 2022. As an amateur, he won a silver medal at the 2011 World Championships, and gold the following year at the 2012 Olympics.

Amateur career 
Murata started boxing in the first grade of junior high school. His then trainer was Hiroaki Takami, who competed at the 1984 Summer Olympics. Two years later, he started attending Shinko Boxing Gym in Osaka from his home in Nara City. He was trained under the former Japanese super lightweight champion Hiromu Kuwata at that gym for one year.

He proceeded to Minami-Kyoto High School and was coached there by Maekawa Takemoto, who served as the coach of the 1996 Summer Olympics in Atlanta. Murata went on to capture five national titles. Takemoto died in 2010, at the age of 50.

However, after his admission to Toyo University, he suffered a number of DQ losses in the university league. At that time, he trained at the Physical Training School of the Self Defense Forces, on the recommendation of Takemoto.

After winning the All-Japan Amateur Boxing Championships in the first grade of university in 2004, he captured the bronze medal in the 2005 Asian Amateur Boxing Championships in Ho Chi Minh City, and the silver medal in the 2005 King’s Cup in Bangkok. After that, Murata went on an undefeated streak in his country, winning the All-Japan Amateur Boxing Championships also in 2007, 2009, 2010, and 2011,. However, he was eliminated in the preliminary round by Nikolajs Grisunins at the 2005 World Amateur Boxing Championships, and was also eliminated in the preliminary round by Bakhtiyar Artayev in the 2006 Asian Games. 

In the 2007 World Amateur Boxing Championships he won against Donatas Bondorovas in the first round, but lost to Shawn Estrada in the second round.

At the 2008 1st Asian Olympic Qualifying Tournament in Bangkok, Thailand, he won over Narmandakh Shinebayar in the quarterfinal but lost to Elshod Rasulov in the semifinal. In the 2nd AIBA Asian 2008 Olympic Qualifying Tournament in Astana, Kazakhstan, he was eliminated in the quarterfinal by Homayoun Amiri and ended in the seventh place.

Murata retired as a boxer after failing to qualify for the 2008 Summer Olympics. After graduating from the university, he started coaching at the boxing club while working as an employee of his alma mater. A year and a half later, he resumed his boxing career.

In 2010, he secured the bronze medal by winning over Udai Al-Hindawi in the quarterfinal of the China Open Tournament in Guiyang, China, but lost to Husan Baymatov in the semifinal. In the 2010 Kazakhstan President's Cup in Astana, he won over Levan Guledani in the preliminary round but lost to Danabek Suzhanov in the quarterfinal.

In July 2011, he won the gold medal at the 21st President's Cup in Jakarta.

At the 2011 World Amateur Boxing Championships, Murata won over his preliminary contest over Leandro Sanchez (24–11). In a big upset, Murata stopped two-time world champion Abbos Atoev in the first round. He subsequently defeated Mohammad Sattarpour (22–11, in the second round) and Stefan Härtel (18–15, in the third round). By beating Härtel, Murata secured qualification for the 2012 Summer Olympics. In the quarter-final, he beat Darren O'Neill (18-9). Finally he defeated Esquiva Falcão (24–11) to qualify for the final. Murata's run came to an end against Evhen Khytrov, losing a close match (22–24) and taking home the silver medal.

2012 Olympics 
In the 2012 Summer Olympics, second-seeded Murata defeated Algeria's Abdelmalek Rahou 21–12 in the round of 16 at the ExCeL London on 2 August 2012. He subsequently beat Turkey's Adem Kılıççı 17–13 in the quarter-finals on 6 August, and also outpointed Uzbekistan's Abbos Atoev 13–12 in the semi-finals on 10 August. In the final on 11 August, he beat the Esquiva Falcão with a score of 14–13 and took the gold medal.

After winning the quarter-finals, Murata and Florentino were both assured of the first men's boxing medal for their countries since the 1968 Summer Olympics. It was a tough, close bout.

Murata is the hundredth gold medalist for Japan in their Olympic history. His is Japan's first boxing gold medal since Takao Sakurai won in the bantamweight class in 1964, and also is the first-ever boxing medal in a weight class other than bantamweight or flyweight.

The Brazilian Olympic Committee asked the International Boxing Association (AIBA) for a review of the final, but the AIBA turned down the request.

Murata finished his amateur career with a record of 119–18 (89 RSC).

Results 
Men's Middleweight (75 kg)
 Round of 16: Ryōta Murata, Japan (21) def Abdelmalek Rahou, Algeria (12)
 Quarterfinals: Ryōta Murata, Japan (17) def Adem Kılıççı, Turkey (13)
 Semi-finals: Ryōta Murata, Japan (13) def Abbos Atoev, Uzbekistan (12)
 Final: Ryōta Murata, Japan (14) def Esquiva Falcão, Brazil (13)

Professional career 
Murata registered with Misako Boxing Gym in April 2013, and signed with Top Rank in June. He also asked Teiken Promotions for cooperation in promotion. Murata is sponsored by Dentsu.  Before turning professional, Murata had declined participation in AIBA Pro Boxing by saying that he intended to retire as a boxer. Upon turning professional, Murata was banned from Japan Amateur Boxing Federation (JABF) for his disloyal behavior in February 2013.

Qualified as a professional boxer in April 2013, he was cleared to fight in eight or more round bouts. His professional debut took place in a six-round bout at a 161 lb catchweight against Akio Shibata at the Ariake Coliseum on 25 August 2013. Murata won the bout by a second-round technical knockout. Murata went on to win his first four fights by knockout.

Murata's first fight in the U.S. took place in November 2015 against Gunnar Jackson. He won the fight via unanimous decision (99-91, 98-92, 97-93), outworking Jackson throughout most of the bout.

Murata (8-0, 5 KOs), who was ranked fourth in the WBC middleweight ratings at the time, faced Gaston Alejandro Vega (24-10-1, 10 KOs) of Argentina on 30 January in Shanghai, on the under card of Chinese superstar Zou Shiming against Natan Santana Coutinho . Murata won the fight by KO in the second round.

WBA (Regular) middleweight champion

Murata vs. N'Dam 
After 12 consecutive victories, Murata fought for the vacant WBA (Regular) title against Hassan N'Dam N'Jikam on 27 May 2017. Murata lost a very controversial split decision (116-111, 115-112, 110-117), in a match which many thought he'd won. N'Dam N'Jikam was knocked down in Round 4 but survived and got the decision. The two judges who scored the fight for N'Dam N'Jikam were immediately suspended and WBA president Gilberto Mendoza issued a public apology. A rematch was immediately ordered by the WBA, and scheduled for 22 October.

Murata vs. N'Dam II 
On 22 October, Murata decisively beat N'Dam N'Jikam, who threw in the towel after round 7. Murata's body attack wore his opponent down, he also hurt him with a series of combinations. The fight was attended by 8,500 people at the Ryōgoku Kokugikan. This was N'Dam N'Jikam's first stoppage loss.

After the fight, Murata said, "I know that you’re going to have a rougher time after you win a title. And there are other very strong champions in this weight class at other organizations. The people here know it. I will aim to be at their level." With the win, Murata became Japan's first Olympic medalist to win a world title, as well as the first Japanese middleweight world champion since Shinji Takehara.

Murata vs. Blandamura 
On 15 April, Murata retained his secondary middleweight world title with a one-sided eighth-round knockout of Emanuele Blandamura at the Yokohama Arena in Yokohama, Japan. Blandamura was ranked #6 by the WBA at middleweight. Defending his 160-pound belt for the first time since knocking out Hassan N'Dam in the seventh round of their October rematch to claim the title, Murata had a similarly easy time with Blandamura.

Murata vs. Brant 
Murata failed to defend his WBA middleweight world title and suffered his second defeat on 20 October in Las Vegas, losing to mandatory challenger Rob Brant of the U.S. by unanimous decision, 118-110, 119-109 and 119-109. Brant was ranked #3 by the WBA and #11 by the IBF at the time. Brant threw over 1,200 punches to get the decision, wearing Murata out and down over the course of the fight.

Murata vs. Brant II 
Brant made his second defense of WBA "regular" middleweight title against Murata on 12 July 2019 at Edion Arena in Osaka, Japan. Murata regained the WBA "regular" middleweight title with a stunning 64 power punches he landed on Brant in Round 2, forcing referee Luis Pabon to stop the bout 2 minutes 34 seconds into the round. Murata's 64 power punches connected were the second most by a middleweight in a round next to Mike McCallum 's 74 landed punches in a fifth-round TKO of Nicky Walker in 1991.

Murata vs. Butler 
Murata defended his regained title on 23 May December 2019 at the Yokohama Arena against hard-punching Canadian contender Steven Butler (27-1). Butler was ranked #8 by the WBA at middleweight. Murata's power showed up right from the start, but Butler managed to keep up with the champion in the early rounds using his long reach and fast combinations. However, Murata's constant offense, sharp jab and powerful rights started to wear down Butler in round four. Near the end of Round 5, Murata drove Butler to the ropes and began to unleash a series of hard punches, before landing a devastating left hook that caused Butler to crash down on the canvas. Referee Rafael Ramos immediately halted the contest, thus giving Murata the victory by TKO.

WBA (Super) middleweight champion 
In January 2021, Murata was elevated to the status of full WBA (Super) middleweight champion. The position had previously been vacant after the previous Super champion Canelo Álvarez had vacated the title to move up to the super-middleweight division.

Murata vs. Golovkin 

After multiple rumors suggesting that Murata was set to take on IBF and IBO champion Gennady Golovkin in a unification match, it was announced on 27 October 2021 that a deal had finally been agreed between the two to stage the bout at the Saitama Super Arena in Saitama, Japan on 29 December 2021. The fight eventually took place on 9 April 2022. Murata suffered a ninth-round TKO loss.

Personal life
Murata was married in May 2010. His son was born in May 2011.

Professional boxing record

See also 
October 2011 in sports#Boxing
Boxing at the 2012 Summer Olympics – Qualification
Japan at the 2012 Summer Olympics
Chronological summary of the 2012 Summer Olympics#Day 15: Sat 11 August
List of Olympic medalists in boxing#Middleweight
List of 2012 Summer Olympics medal winners#Boxing
List of Japanese boxing world champions

References

Video references

External links 

Ryōta Murata's daily results International Boxing Association

Ryota Murata - Profile, News Archive & Current Rankings at Box.Live

|-

Middleweight boxers
People from Nara, Nara
Toyo University alumni
1986 births
Living people
Boxers at the 2012 Summer Olympics
Olympic boxers of Japan
Olympic gold medalists for Japan
Olympic medalists in boxing
Boxers at the 2006 Asian Games
Medalists at the 2012 Summer Olympics
Japanese male boxers
AIBA World Boxing Championships medalists
Recipients of the Medal with Purple Ribbon
Asian Games competitors for Japan